KRRW may refer to:

 KRRW (FM), a radio station (105.9 FM) licensed to serve Winthrop, Minnesota, United States
 KEMJ, a radio station (101.5 FM) licensed to serve St. James, Minnesota, which held the call sign KRRW from 1997 to 2020
 KBFB, a radio station (97.9 FM) licensed to serve Dallas, Texas, United States, which held the call sign KLLI from 1993 to 1997